Flat Gap may refer to:
Flat Gap, Kentucky, a community in Johnson County, Kentucky
Flat Gap, Tennessee, a community in Wayne County, Tennessee